Leonid Koltun (born September 7, 1944) is a retired Soviet football player and current Ukrainian coach.

Coaching record

External links
 Semenko, V. "The team was fed buckwheat cereal" ("Команда харчувалася гречаною кашею"). Gazeta.ua. 15 March 2007.
 Tropin, A. Coach Leonid Koltun: The whole machine of Soviet football worked against attempts of "Dnipro" to become champions (Тренер Леонід Колтун: Вся машина радянського футболу працювала проти того, щоб «Дніпро» став чемпіоном). Dnipropetrovsk News. 5 September 2013.
 

1944 births
Living people
Footballers from Kharkiv
Soviet footballers
Ukrainian footballers
Ukrainian football managers
Ukrainian expatriate football managers
FC Metalist Kharkiv players
MFC Mykolaiv players
FC Zirka Kropyvnytskyi players
FC Dnipro players
FC Nyva Ternopil managers
FC Rotor Volgograd managers
FC Vorskla Poltava managers
MFC Mykolaiv managers
FC Polissya Zhytomyr managers
FC Metalurh Zaporizhzhia managers
FC Torpedo Zaporizhzhia managers
FC Dnipro managers
Ukrainian Premier League managers
Expatriate football managers in China
Jiangsu F.C. managers
Ukrainian expatriate sportspeople in China
Association football goalkeepers
Soviet Top League players